Oran "Juice" Jones (born March 28, 1957) is an American retired R&B singer.

Biography

Early life
Jones was born in Houston, Texas, and raised in Harlem, New York City, New York. He graduated from the United States Naval Academy in 1981, serving as a sniper officer in the Marine Corps before becoming a musician.

Music career
Jones was the first musician signed to OBR Records, a subsidiary of Def Jam (which is now part of Universal Music Group).

His song "The Rain" became a hit in 1986, peaking at #9 on the Billboard Hot 100. It ranks him on VH1's top 100 One Hit Wonders of the '80s. He followed it with "How to Love Again," a duet with labelmate Alyson Williams. Jones received a Grammy nomination for "The Rain", with Best R&B Vocal Performance, Male.

Jones released two more albums, but these failed to have significant follow-up success. He collaborated twice with pornography actress and singer, Midori. In 1997 they record a duet of "Let's Stay Together" for his album Player's Call and Jones appeared on Midori's single "5,10,15,20" on the Porn to Rock compilation album released in 1999.

Personal life

Two of his children—his son Oran II, who has also performed as Mookie, and daughter Perri—followed their father into the music business.

Discography

Studio albums

Singles

References

External links

SoulInStereo.com's update page, "Whatever Happened To...," on Oran "Juice" Jones, contributed by Edward Bowser on November 19, 2013

1959 births
Living people
American soul singers
Musicians from Houston
United States Marines
United States Naval Academy alumni
20th-century African-American male singers